Zgornji Jakobski Dol is a settlement in the Municipality of Pesnica in northeastern Slovenia. It lies in the Slovene Hills. The area is part of the traditional region of Styria. The municipality is now included in the Drava Statistical Region.

A small roadside chapel-shrine on the road to Polička Vas was built in 1909.

References

External links
Zgornji Jakobski Dol on Geopedia

Populated places in the Municipality of Pesnica